The Weekly Register-Call is the oldest weekly newspaper in Colorado. It is published by Robert Sweeney in Black Hawk, Colorado.  The newspaper was originally known as the Miners' Register (also Daily Miners' Register), which was changed to the Central City Register (also called Daily) on July 26, 1868, and after an 1870s merger it has been known as the Register-Call.

Newspapers published in Colorado
Weekly newspapers published in the United States
Central City, Colorado